Ken LaRose is an American college athletics administrator and former football player and coach. He is the associate athletic director for development as Butler University in Indianapolis, Indiana. LaRose served as the head football coach at Butler from 1992 to 2001, compiling a record of 46–54.

Head coaching record

References

Year of birth missing (living people)
Living people
American football offensive linemen
Butler Bulldogs football coaches
Butler Bulldogs football players
High school football coaches in Indiana